Voices & Harps is a music album by Irish musicians Moya Brennan and Cormac de Barra. It was released on 28 June 2011 in the United States. The album is a remastered and remixed version of the 2010 album My Match Is a Makin'.

Release
Voices & Harps was released during Brennan and de Barra's United States tour in the Summer of 2011, although was available from the duo's website in the months before.

Track listing
The album's track listing differs slightly from that of My Match Is A Makin'.

* Renamed, released on "My Match Is a Makin'" under the Gaelic title, "Tá Mo Chleamhnas a Dhéanamh"
** New track
*** Renamed, released on "My Match Is a Makin'" as 'Mo Mhian'

**** released exclusively through iTunes as bonus track

Personnel
 Moya Brennan – vocals, harp, percussion, keyboards
 Cormac De Barra – harp, vocals, percussion, keyboards
 Máire Breatnach – fiddle, viola
 Aisling Jarvis – bouzouki
 Ian Parker – keyboards
 Éamonn De Barra – flute, bodhran
 Noel Eccles – percussion
 John Reynolds – drums
 Kevin Armstrong – guitar
Technical
 Produced by Moya Brennan and Cormac De Barra
 Additional production by John Reynolds
 Recorded and Engineered by Lochlainn Harte, John Bradshaw and Fionán De Barra
 Mixed by John Reynolds and Tim Oliver
 Photography by Mella Travers
 Sleeve Design by Tim Jarvis and Mella Travers

Release history

References

External links
 Voices & Harps – Official website
 Moya Brennan – Official website
 Cormac De Barra – Official website

Moya Brennan albums
2011 albums